The flaming sunbird (Aethopyga flagrans) is a species of bird in the family Nectariniidae.
It is endemic to the northern Philippines.

Its natural habitat is subtropical or tropical moist lowland forests.

References

flaming sunbird
Birds of Luzon
Fauna of Catanduanes
Endemic birds of the Philippines
flaming sunbird
Taxonomy articles created by Polbot